Leonid Sergeyevich Smirnov (1889 in Moscow – 1980) was an association football player. Smirnov made his debut for the Russian Empire on July 3, 1912 in a friendly against Norway. He was selected for the 1912 Olympics squad, but did not play in any games at the tournament.

References

External links
  Profile

1889 births
1980 deaths
Footballers from the Russian Empire
Footballers at the 1912 Summer Olympics
Olympic footballers from the Russian Empire
Association football forwards